Chris Turner is a New Zealand former footballer who played as a midfielder. He represented the New Zealand national team at international level.

Turner scored on full All Whites debut in a 3–0 win over Fiji on 3 July 1979 and ended his international playing career with eight A-international caps and one goal to his credit, his final cap an appearance in a 6–1 win over Solomon Islands on 29 February 1980 before an injury to his knee ended his international career.

References 

1959 births
Living people
New Zealand association footballers
Association football midfielders
New Zealand international footballers
1980 Oceania Cup players
Manurewa AFC players